HighNote Records is a jazz record company and label founded by Joe Fields with his son, Barney Fields, in 1997.

Joe Fields worked for Prestige Records in the 1960s, and in the 1970s founded Muse Records. After he sold Muse, he started the Highnote and Savant labels with his son, Barney. Many of the artists on Highnote previously recorded for Muse.

The catalogue includes Cindy Blackman, Larry Coryell, Joey DeFrancesco, Charles Earland, Russell Gunn, Etta Jones, Sheila Jordan, Houston Person, and Jimmy Ponder.

Discography

HighNote Records

Savant Records

Sister label 
Fedora Records, founded in the late 1990s

References

External links

American record labels
Jazz record labels